Dan Millice is an American mastering engineer based out of Engine Room Audio in New York City.

Education and career
Dan Millice was born in North Carolina and graduated from Appalachian State University with a bachelor's degree in music industry studies. He began his mastering career at Masterdisk and then joined Engine Room Audio in 2011 as a full-time Mastering Engineer.

Dan has done mastering work, audio restoration, and remastering projects for a large and diverse number of artists that include CJ Fly, Kirk Knight, Al Green Julian Lage, Nels Cline, Chris Eldridge, Townes Van Zandt, Ann Peebles, Boogarins, French Montana, Xylouris White, Mutual Benefit, Mick Jenkins, Casanova, Ex Reyes, People's Blues of Richmond, Blue Foundation, Cal Maro, Uncle Murda, Landlady, Chinx, The Southern Belles, Kristin Andreassen, Jesse Boykins III, Margaret Glaspy, Flipp Deniro, Tribe Society, Pool Cosby, Yellow Shoots, Mike Liegel, A Valley Son, Little Kruta, JB Andrews, Tan Boys, Crimdella, Tongues Unknown, Holly Miranda, Junior Astronomers, Thaddeus Anna Greene, Lauren Lanzaretta, Midnight Passenger, By Light We Loom, Ray Flanagan & The Authorities, 50 Cent, A$AP Rocky, Mobb Deep, Trey Songz, Vado, Chimaira, Schoolboy Q, Wale, Joey Bada$$, Lloyd Banks, Bryant Dope, Ohio Sky, Nicholas Megalis, Invisible Familiars, Gentlemen Hall, Hella, BOYFRNDZ, Mt. Eden, Feuding Fathers, Glassjaw, Island Twins, Chargaux, Bilal Karaman, Gevende, Eastern Hollows, John Michael Rochelle, Ben Rector, Steve Everett, The Bergamot, Cloudeater, The Gregory Brothers and many others.

References

Mastering engineers
Living people
Appalachian State University alumni
Year of birth missing (living people)